Makovo is a rural locality (a selo) in Volodarsky District of Astrakhan Oblast, Russia, located in the delta of the Volga River.

Rural localities in Volodarsky District, Astrakhan Oblast